Vangaveeti is a 2016 Indian Telugu-language biographical action film written and directed by Ram Gopal Varma. The film is based on the life of politician Vangaveeti Mohana Ranga, and his elder brother Vangaveeti Radha Krishna and their altercation with communist dominated Vijayawada of the 1970s-80s in Andhra Pradesh.

The film stars Sandeep Kumar, Vamsi Nakkanti, Kautilya, Shritej, Vamsi Chaganti, and Naina Ganguly. 
The theatrical trailer of the film was released on 2 October 2016 in Hyderabad, and the film was released on 23 December 2016.

Plot
Set up in the 1970s Vijayawada, Vangaveeti Ranga's elder brother, Vangaveeti Radha also known as "Bustand Radha", gets associated with Communist Party of India, secretary for Vijayawada, Venkata Rathnam. After few years, conflicts arise between Venkata Rathnam, and Vangaveeti Radha, to get a hold on the Vijayawada transport business, dominated by the followers of Venkata Rathnam.

In 1972, Venkata Rathnam was murdered by Vangaveeti Radha and his supporters. These events, in turn, leads to the retaliation by a rival group, and the murder of Vangaveeti Radha. Upon the death of Vangaveeti Radha, his brother Mohana Ranga takes over the leadership of United independent Organization with the support of student union leaders Devineni Gandhi, and Devineni Nehru.

However, leadership issues and power struggles between politically powerful Mohana Ranga, and the Devineni Family leads to the splitting of the United independent organization, and in retaliation, Mohana Ranga's associate's murder Devineni Gandhi in 1979. At this juncture, Mohana Ranga's political career begins in 1981, when he contests in the municipal election when the Indian National Congress Party withdrew its official candidate in his favour. Later, his rival in the district, Nehru, gets sponsored by the Telugu Desam Party (TDP), which was dominated by the Kamma caste, while Ranga becomes a leader from Kapu community and stood for downtrodden. Ranga becomes an MLA for the Congress Party in 1985; Nehru becomes a TDP MLA, and eventually a minister.

Starting in 1983, both leaders implicate themselves in gang warfare, which was fed by caste rivalry between Kamma and Kapu; while N. T. Rama Rao was at the time the first Kamma chief minister of Andhra Pradesh. In 1988, Devineni Nehru's younger brother, Devineni Murali, was murdered by Mohana Ranga's associates in retaliation for his killings of few Ranga's associates. Subsequently, while on a hunger strike in support of issues of farmers, a group of men led by political rivals  in the region, attack Mohana Ranga's camp in the early hours of 25 December 1988.

Cast

Soundtrack
The music was composed by Ravi Shankar and released by Mango Music.

See also
Gaayam, a 1993 action film based on Vijaywada Gang Warfare, directed by Ram Gopal Varma
Gaayam 2, a 2010 sequel to Gaayam, directed by Praveen Sri
Bejawada, a 2011 action film directed by Vivek Krishna

References

External links
 

2016 films
Indian neo-noir films
Indian political films
2016 crime action films
Indian films about revenge
2010s Telugu-language films
Indian crime action films
Films set in the 1980s
Indian biographical films
Biographical action films
Films set in Andhra Pradesh
Films shot in Andhra Pradesh
Indian political thriller films
Journalism adapted into films
Films directed by Ram Gopal Varma
Crime films based on actual events
Films about organised crime in India
Indian gangster films
Indian avant-garde and experimental films